Bruno Jenkins may refer to:

Bruno Jenkins, a nurse in the BBC medical drama Casualty
Bruno Jenkins, a young boy in Roald Dahl's The Witches